Berkovci is a settlement northwest of Prosenjakovci in the Municipality of Moravske Toplice in the Prekmurje region of Slovenia.

There is a small chapel in the settlement with a three-story belfry. It was built in 1913.

Name
The name of the settlement was changed from Berkovci to Berkovci pri Prosenjakovcih in 1955. The name was later shortened to Berkovci.

References

External links 
Berkovci on Geopedia

Populated places in the Municipality of Moravske Toplice